Landing on Water is the 15th studio album by Neil Young. The album was released on July 21, 1986, by Geffen Records. Several of the songs on the album were resurrected from Neil Young and Crazy Horse's failed 1984 sessions – a set of sessions where, according to longtime producer David Briggs, the musicians "played like monkeys".

Track listing

Personnel
Neil Young – harmonica, lead guitar, producer, synthesizer, vocals
Steve Jordan – drums, synthesizer, vocals
Danny Kortchmar – guitar, producer, synthesizer, vocals
San Francisco Boys Chorus – vocals on tracks "Violent Side" and "Touch the Night"
Technical
Niko Bolas – engineer, mixing
Richard Bosworth – engineer
Julie Last – engineer
Laura LiPuma – design
Louis Magor – choir director
Tim Mulligan – engineer
Doug Sax – mastering, original mastering
Duane Seykora – engineer
Bernard Shakey – art director

Charts
Album

Singles

References

1986 albums
Geffen Records albums
Neil Young albums
Albums produced by Neil Young
Albums produced by Danny Kortchmar